The Namibia Football Association (NFA) is the governing body of football in Namibia. It was founded in 1990, and affiliated to FIFA and to CAF in 1992. It organizes the national football league and the national team. Its aim is to create a football culture and industry that provides entertainment and economical benefits for all; to become a dominant national association within the confederation via the professionalism of the game's administration; to promote education and development programmes in all aspects of the game, particularly regarding youth and women's football; and to provide a force for cohesion in society.

Its Mission:

Promoting and facilitating the development of football through sustainable structures and training initiatives;
Engage in pro-active dialogue with the government to cultivate recognition of the game as a national asset;
Create a mutual beneficial relationship with the corporate world.
Create the image of being a transparent, stable and progressive organization;
Do all it can to engage its national teams and clubs in international competitions and in doing so contribute to rise of Africa as a football powerhouse.

On 22 July 2020, the NFA officially expelled the Namibia Premier League as a member and a 2 year absence of soccer comes from the disputes of these two bodies, and founded the Namibia Football Premier League in 2021.

The Leagues 
Namibia Football Premier League
First Division
Regional Second Division

References

External links 
 
 Namibia at the FIFA website
 Namibia at CAF Online
 Namibia Football Association at the Namibia Sports Commission

Namibia
Football in Namibia
Football
Sports organizations established in 1990